Koothu or Therukoothu (jwalith), is an ancient art, where artists play songs with dance and music in storytelling the epics, performed in Tamil; it is a folk art originated from the early Tamil country. More precisely Koothu refers to either Terukuttu (Tamil:தெருக்கூத்து) or Kattaikkuttu. The terms Terukkuttu and Kattaikkuttu are often used interchangeably in modern times; however, historically, the two terms appear to have distinguished, at least in certain villages, between two different kinds of performance: while Terukkuttu referred to mobile performances in a procession, Kattaikkuttu denotes overnight, narrative performances at a fixed performance space. Koothu as a form of entertainment reached its peak hundreds of years ago in Tamil Nadu, as mentioned in the Sangam texts about the development of iyal (literature), isai (music) and natagam (drama). Going beyond just a means of entertainment, koothu educates the rural people about religion and their history.

Koothu is an informal dance structure, in which performances generally depict scenes from ancient epics such as Ramayana, Mahabharata and Tamil classical epics. There is traditionally no spoken dialogue, only songs. Artists are trained to sing in their own voice and in a high pitch to reach the entire crowd, since no amplification technology is used. The artists are dressed up with complex heavy costumes and have a very bright elaborated makeup. They put on towering head dresses, sparkling shoulder plates and wide colorful skirts. Traditionally, this theatre form has been predominantly male, though in modern times more females have been included (for example Girl's Theatre at the Kattaikkuttu Gurukulam).

Types of koothu include Nattu Koothu, Kuravai Koothu, and Valli Koorhu, which are about the state and culture of different peoples in Tamil country; Samaya Koothu showcases religious topics, while Porkaala Koothu, Pei Koothu, and Thunangai Koothu are focused on the martial arts and war of the country. Another important art form Chakyar Koothu, is very popular in Kerala. There is mention of this koothu in Silappatikaram.

In the past years, there were no formal training institutions, schools or nattuvanar (teacher) for koothu. Now, to encourage the dying art, there are some workshops for koothu called koothu pattarai, and also some dedicated schools (efor example Kattaikkuttu Gurukulam).

Koothu eventually spread from Tamil Nadu into most of South India, particularly Karnataka and Kerala. It is very popular in rural areas and has remained relatively unchanged even in modern times.

The deity at the Thillai Nataraja Temple, Chidambaram is known from the Sangam period as "Thillai Koothan", the cosmic dancer of Thillai; the Sanskrit translation of this is Nataraja.

Outside India

As Tamils migrated abroad to different areas such as Mauritius, Réunion, Guyana, Malaya, South Africa, Fiji, Mauritius, Trinidad and Tobago, Guyana, Suriname, Jamaica, French Guiana, Guadeloupe, and Martinique, they took this kuthu dance form to their new settlements, thereby promoting its growth universally.

In Fiji, Therukootu is also known as Tirikutu.

Fijians born of Southern Indian descent that have immigrated to Western Canada and parts of United States have also carried the traditional dance over, performing it at Hindu Temples (Mandirs) and other community venues in city's like Edmonton, Calgary and Vancouver.

The first known Tirikutu to be performed in North America was held in Calgary during the winter of 1993 by a team called "AM & Party" (founded in Edmonton). They would successfully finish their debut show "Bhishma Sandai" at a community hall but unfortunately get into an accident driving their tour bus back to Edmonton on Alberta Highway 2, the team was rescued via helicopter but no other details have been made clear to the public surrounding this incident. They would make a return in 1994 performing for the first time at Vishnu Mandir in Edmonton and then returning to Calgary in 1995 for their performance of "Gambhirasura", footage of this Tirikutu would be uploaded to YouTube by "Tamil Nadagam Edmonton" on June 5, 2022.

"Tamil Nadagam Edmonton" was founded in 2011 in support of a combined Tirikutu team consisting of members from "AM & Party" and surrounding groups from Canada and the United States. This team is still actively performing today with their last performance being in Edmonton at Vishnu Mandir in March of 2022.

See also
Dance forms of Tamil Nadu
Dappan koothu
 Pandaravanniyan Koothu

References

External links
 Therukoothu.org
 TheruKoothu documentary, Bay of Bengal Programme Inter-Governmental Organisation
 Thenmodi koothu: https://kalaikurusil.com/
 
Tamil culture
Tamil dance styles
Classical theatre of india